In organic chemistry, an allene oxide is an epoxide of an allene.  The parent allene oxide is CH2=C(O)CH2 (CAS RN 40079-14-9), a rare and reactive species of only theoretical interest.  Typical allene oxides require steric protection for their isolation.  Certain derivatives can be prepared by epoxidation of the allenes with peracetic acid.  Allene oxides tend to rearrange to cyclopropanones.

Despite the esoteric character of synthetic allene oxides, allene oxides occur naturally. They are intermediates in the chemical defense of some plants against attack by herbivores.  Specifically, a hydroperoxide of linolenic acid is the substrate for the enzyme allene oxide synthase.  The resulting allene oxide in turn is converted by allene oxide cyclase to jasmonic acid.

References

Epoxides
Alkenes